The Scrabbletown Historic and Archeological District in a historic district in North Kingstown, Rhode Island.

The district was added to the National Register of Historic Places in 1985.

See also
National Register of Historic Places listings in Washington County, Rhode Island

References

North Kingstown, Rhode Island
Historic districts in Washington County, Rhode Island
Historic districts on the National Register of Historic Places in Rhode Island